Kipa Babu is a Bharatiya Janata Party politician from Arunachal Pradesh. He has been elected in Arunachal Pradesh Legislative Assembly election in 2004 from Itanagar.

References 

People from Itanagar
Arunachal Pradesh MLAs 2004–2009
Living people
Bharatiya Janata Party politicians from Arunachal Pradesh
21st-century Indian politicians
Year of birth missing (living people)